Gian Franco Allala Menéndez (born 17 January 1997) is an Uruguayan footballer who plays as a defender for Defensor Sporting Club.

Career statistics

Club

Notes

References

1997 births
Living people
Association football defenders
Uruguayan footballers
Uruguayan expatriate footballers
Uruguayan Segunda División players
Uruguayan Primera División players
Tercera División players
Segunda División B players
Liverpool F.C. (Montevideo) players
Rampla Juniors players
Sud América players
Cádiz CF players
Cádiz CF B players
Miramar Misiones players
CD Izarra footballers
Uruguayan expatriate sportspeople in Spain
Expatriate footballers in Spain